Atrypanius albocinctus is a species of longhorn beetles of the subfamily Lamiinae. It was described by Melzer in 1930, and is known from southeastern Brazil, Paraguay, and Argentina.

References

Beetles described in 1930
Beetles of South America
Acanthocinini